Rionegro Province is one of the 15 provinces in the Cundinamarca Department, in Colombia.

Provinces of Cundinamarca Department